Kondratiev, Kondratyev or Kondratieff is a Slavic surname (feminine form: Kondratieva or Kondratyeva). People of this name include:
 Adelina Kondrátieva (1917–2012), Argentine-born Russian translator and Brigadista
 Alexei Kondratiev (1949–2010), American scholar specializing in Celtic languages and cultures
 Dmitri Kondratyev (born 1969), cosmonaut
 Georgi Kondratiev (born 1960), footballer
 Georgy Mihailovich Kondratiev (1887–1958), Russian physicist
 Ivan Kondratyev (1849–1904), Russian poet and writer
 Kirill Kondratyev (1920–2006), Russian atmospheric physicist
 Lyudmila Kondratyeva (born 1958), Russian sprinter and 1980 Olympic champion
 Maria Kondratieva (born 1982), Russian tennis player
 Maxim Kondratyev (born 1983), Russian ice-hockey player
 Nataliya Kondratyeva (born 1986), Russian judoka
 Nikolai Kondratiev (1892–1938), Russian economist who researched Kondratiev waves
 Oksana Kondratyeva (born 1985), Russian hammer thrower, daughter of Lyudmila
 Sergei Kondratyev
 Veniamin Kondratyev (born 1970), governor of Krasnodar Krai
 Vladyslav Kondratyev (born 1990), Ukrainian basketball player
 Yekaterina Kondratyeva (born 1982), Russian sprinter
 Yuri Kondratiev (born 1953), Ukrainian mathematician

Russian-language surnames